Cecil Quentin (1852 – 29 October 1926) was a British sailor who competed in the 1900 Summer Olympics in Le Havre, France. Quentin took the gold in the 20+ ton.

He was educated at Cheltenham College.

References

External links

 

British male sailors (sport)
Sailors at the 1900 Summer Olympics – 20+ ton
Olympic sailors of Great Britain
1852 births
1926 deaths
Olympic gold medallists for Great Britain
Olympic medalists in sailing
Medalists at the 1900 Summer Olympics
Date of birth missing
Sportspeople from Waterford (city)
Irish emigrants to the United Kingdom